The Olomouc Law Book or Commemorative Book of Olomouc (shelfmark SOk AO, cod. Knihy, 1540) is an illuminated manuscript created for the city of Olomouc around 1430 and currently in the municipal archives. Although in the past attributed to the local copyist Václav of Jihlava (1398–1477) or to the illustrator Vaněk, a town councilor in 1435–39, the illumination is more likely the masterwork of a foreign artist. It is in the style of International Gothic with clear Austrian influence.

References

15th-century illuminated manuscripts